The 1962 New York Titans season was the third season for the team in the American Football League (AFL), and the final season for the franchise before becoming the Jets the following season. The Titans finished in last place in the AFL East with a record of 5–9.

Roster

Schedule

Regular season

Standings

External links
1962 Titans statistics

New York Jets seasons
New York Titans
New York Titans
Washington Heights, Manhattan
1960s in Manhattan